The North German Constitution was the constitution of the North German Confederation, which existed as a country from 1 July 1867 to 31 December 1870. The Constitution of the German Empire (1871) was closely based on it. 

A  constituent Reichstag was elected on 12 February 1867. Its only task was to discuss, amend and adopt the proposal for a constitution which had been largely written by Otto von Bismarck, the Prussian minister president and first and only federal chancellor, the sole minister of the Confederation. The constituent Reichstag was dominated by national liberals and moderate conservatives.

The highest body of the country was the Bundesrat (Federal Council). It represented the governments of the North German states. Prussia had 17 of 43 votes in the Bundesrat. Decisions were based on a simple majority (Article 7), but Prussia's great size and influence often gave it what amounted to a veto. He installed the chancellor, who was the federal executive. Besides the chancellor, there were no official ministers.

The Reichstag was the lower house of parliament, elected by all male north Germans above the age of 25. This was quite extraordinary in those times; Bismarck introduced this in the hope that it would create conservative majorities. The Reichstag and Bundesrat together had legislative powers, making the democratically elected Reichstag an important and powerful body.

After the Franco-Prussian War of 1870/1871, the south German states Baden, Bavaria and Württemberg joined the confederation. It was renamed  (German Empire), and the constitution of the confederation, with few changes, became the Constitution of the German Empire.

References

External links
Text of the Constitution 

North German Confederation
Otto von Bismarck
1867 in law
1867 documents
1867 in politics
Historical constitutions of Germany
July 1867 events